Mohsin Hani Al Bahrani is a business magnate, entrepreneur, investor of Omani origin. He is the CEO of MHD ACERE which constitutes the cluster of automotive, construction equipment, and renewable energy divisions of the Mohsin Haider Darwish Group. He was named in Arabian Business's GCC Young Achievers for 2021 list.

Biography
Mohsin is the grandson of the late Mohsin Haider Darwish. After finishing his Bachelors of Science in Business Administration and Management from Brunel University, he graduated in MA, Middle Eastern Studies from King's College London, the United Kingdom in 2019.

He joined Mohsin Haider Darwish L.L.C. as director of automotive in 2019, handling Jaguar Land Rover, MG Motor, McLaren Automotive, Volvo, Ashok Leyland, Ford Trucks, Michelin, BF Goodrich, and XCMG in Oman. He became the CEO of Mohsin Haider Darwish L.L.C. in 2020. He is a board member of the Omani Turkish Friendship Association and an investor in Ajna Lens, a Mumbai-based XR hardware and software firm. He is also the CEO of the Mohsin Haider Darwish Training Institute.

Mohsin was credited with developing a Renewable Energy and Electric Vehicle Chargers Division and struck an agreement with ABB as the sole distributor for Electric Vehicle Charging Solutions.

Awards and recognition
Emerging Business Leader of the Year (Alam Al-Iktisaad Awards 2020), Young Business Leader of the Year (Dossier Construction Infrastructure award and summit 2020), and Leaders of Tomorrow (CHRO Asia and the World HRD Congress).

He is a member of the Oman – Turkey Friendship Association. He is also a recipient of the TAS Icons of Oman, where he was named among the top 50 personalities in Oman with a direct impact on the growth of the country. He was also named as a GCC Young Achiever for 2021 by Arabian Business magazine.

Mohsin bin Hani al Bahrani was elected as the chairman of Al Amerat club during the foundation general assembly meeting.

References

Omani businesspeople
Omani billionaires
Living people
Year of birth missing (living people)
Alumni of King's College London